Malawi, officially the Republic of Malawi, is a landlocked country in southeast Africa that was formerly known as Nyasaland. Malawi is among the world's least-developed and most-densely populated countries. Around 85% of the population live in rural areas. The economy is based on agriculture, and 41% of GDP and 90% of export revenues come from this. In 2006, in response to disastrously low agricultural harvests, Malawi, through an initiative by the late President Bingu Mutharika, an economist by profession, began a program of fertilizer subsidies that were designed to re-energize the land and boost crop production. It has been reported that this program, championed by the country's president, is radically improving Malawi's agriculture, and causing Malawi to become a net exporter of food to nearby countries. Economic grievances though took a downward slide during Mutharikas second term. Economic grivences was a catalyst that resulted in the 2011 economic protests in Malawi in July.

Notable firms 
This list includes notable companies with primary headquarters located in the country. The industry and sector follow the Industry Classification Benchmark framework. Organizations which have ceased operations are included and noted as defunct.

See also
 Economy of Malawi

References

Companies of Malawi
Economy of Malawi
 
Malawi